Martin Platzer (born 24 September 1963) is an Austrian ice hockey player. He competed in the men's tournaments at the 1984 Winter Olympics and the 1988 Winter Olympics.

References

1963 births
Living people
Austrian ice hockey players
Olympic ice hockey players of Austria
Ice hockey players at the 1984 Winter Olympics
Ice hockey players at the 1988 Winter Olympics
Sportspeople from Villach
20th-century Austrian people